Eteobalea is a genus of moths in the family Cosmopterigidae. It is treated as a synonym of Stagmatophora by some authors.

Species
 Eteobalea aglaopa (Meyrick, 1928) 
 Eteobalea albiapicella (Duponchel, 1843)
 Eteobalea alypella (Klimesch, 1946)
 Eteobalea anonymella (Riedl, 1965)
 Eteobalea beata (Walsingham, 1907)
 Eteobalea dohrnii (Zeller, 1847)
 Eteobalea enchrysa Hodges, 1962
 Eteobalea eurinella Sinev, 1986
 Eteobalea intermediella Riedl, 1966
 Eteobalea iridella (Busck, 1907)
 Eteobalea isabellella (O. Costa, 1836)
 Eteobalea klisieckii (Riedl, 1966)
 Eteobalea pentagama Meyrick, 1928
 Eteobalea phanoptila Meyrick, 1911  (or Eteobalea planoptila)
 Eteobalea quinquecristata (Walsingham, 1891)
 Eteobalea serratella (Treitschke, 1833)
 Eteobalea sexnotella (Chambers, 1878)
 Eteobalea siciliae (Riedl, 1966)
 Eteobalea sumptuosella (Lederer, 1855)
 Eteobalea teucrii (Walsingham, 1907)
 Eteobalea thaumatella (Walsingham, 1907)
 Eteobalea tririvella (Staudinger, 1871)
 Eteobalea vinsoni (Viette, 1953)
 Eteobalea vinsoni vinsoni
 Eteobalea vinsoni abcedella (Viette, 1957)

References

Natural History Museum Lepidoptera genus database
Eteobalea at funet

 
Cosmopteriginae
Moth genera